Dr John Graham MacDonald Burt FRSE LLD (1809–1868) was an eminent Scottish physician and medical author.

Life
He was born on 3 March 1809, in Edinburgh as John Graham Burt. He added the name MacDonald upon marriage.

In the 1830s he is listed as a surgeon, living at 8 Bank Street in Edinburgh's Old Town.

In 1843 he was elected a member of the Aesculapian Club. He was elected a Fellow of the Royal Society of Edinburgh in 1845, his proposer being Robert Christison. He was president of the Royal College of Physicians in Edinburgh from 1863 to 1865. He died on 9 February 1868. He was buried in Dean Cemetery in western Edinburgh, against the north wall of the original cemetery (backing onto the northern Victorian extension), with his wife Susanna Louisa MacDonald (1820-1877).

Family

His son was Major Norman MacDonald Burt (1842-1886) of the Royal Artillery.

Artistic recognition

A bust of Burt by George MacCallum is held at the Royal College of Physicians of Edinburgh.

References

1809 births
1868 deaths
Medical doctors from Edinburgh
British surgeons
Scottish medical writers
Fellows of the Royal Society of Edinburgh
Presidents of the Royal College of Physicians of Edinburgh